O Il-jong (born 1954) is a North Korean politician and three-star general of the Korean People's Army.

Biography
O Il-jong was born in 1954 in Pyongyang. A graduate of economics at the Kim Il-sung University and Kim Il-sung Military University (he graduated from the Academy only in the 90s). He is the son of O Jin-u, the Minister of the Defense of the North Korea who died in 1995, who for years was one of Kim Il-sung's closest associates and one of the most important figures in the North Korean political system.

In the 1980s, O Il-jong worked in diplomacy, he was the military attaché of the DPRK embassy in Egypt. Then, from 1985, he worked at a state-owned foreign trade company. In 1989 he became the commander of the regiment and then a brigade. He received the general nomination for the rank of major-general in April 1992. From November 1994 he was the commander of the 26th Division in the 4th Corps of the Korean People's Army.

During the 3rd Conference of the Workers' Party of Korea on September 28, 2010, he was appointed director of the Military Department of the Central Committee of the Workers' Party of Korea, replacing Kim Song-gyu), was promoted to a two-star Major-General, and was also a member of the Central Committee for the first time. In April 2011 he was promoted to the rank of colonel general.

After the death of Kim Jong-il in December 2011, O Il-jong found himself on the high, 40th place in the 232-person Funeral Committee.

It was reported in January 2017, that O Il-jong along with his two other brothers who are O Il-hun and O Il-su had been purged by Kim Jong-un for an unknown reason. It shocked observers that the three were purged as usually decedents of respected people within the DPRK government tend to be looked after and considering how revered O Jin-u was in order to be honored 20 years after his death with the title of "Revolutionary Martyr".

References

Living people
Date of birth missing (living people)
People from Pyongyang
North Korean generals
Members of the 8th Central Committee of the Workers' Party of Korea
1954 births